COP International, also shortened to COP Int'l., is a music label, based in Oakland, California.

Initially, the label was founded in 1991 by Christian Petke (a.k.a. Count Zero of Deathline Int'l.) in Frankfurt, Germany. A few months later, Kim X, his girlfriend, opened a branch office in Oakland.

The first label full-length release was the California Cyber Crash Compilation. Most of the involved artists, such as Diatribe, Battery, Kode IV, Consolidated, Biohazard PCB (a.k.a. Contagion), Deathline Intl. and Switchblade Symphony, became very popular in the 1990s Electro-industrial scene.

Other leading label groups were Index, Pulse Legion, Unit:187, Pain Emission and The Razor Skyline.

References

External links 
 Interview with Kim X @ Last Sigh
 COP International at Discogs.com

Electronic music record labels
Music of the San Francisco Bay Area